Thomais Emmanouilidou is a retired Greek rower from Kastoria. She owns the single lightweight's national record. In 2017, she came 3d at the rowing world championships U23, winning the bronze medal. She also won a silver medal for Greece, at the 2018 Mediterranean Games.

References

Greek athletes
Greek female rowers
Living people
1993 births
Mediterranean Games silver medalists for Greece
Mediterranean Games medalists in rowing
Competitors at the 2018 Mediterranean Games
Rowers from Kastoria
Survivor Greece contestants